The 1998–99 College of Charleston Cougars men's basketball team represented the College of Charleston during the 1998–99 NCAA Division I men's basketball season. The Cougars, led by 20th-year head coach John Kresse, played their home games at F. Mitchell Johnson Arena in Charleston, South Carolina as first-year members of the Southern Conference.

After finishing atop the conference regular season standings with a peerless 16–0 mark, the Cougars also won the 1999 SoCon tournament  capping a 25-game win streak  to earn an automatic bid to the NCAA tournament as No. 8 seed in the East region. College of Charleston was beaten in the opening round by Tulsa, 62–53. The team finished with an overall record of 28–3 and were ranked No. 16 in the final AP poll.

Roster

Schedule and results 

|-
!colspan=12 style=| Regular season

|-
!colspan=12 style=| SoCon tournament

|-
!colspan=12 style=| NCAA Tournament

Source

Rankings

Awards and honors
Sedric Webber – SoCon Player of the Year
John Kresse – SoCon Coach of the Year

References

College of Charleston Cougars men's basketball seasons
College of Charleston Cougars
College of Charleston
College of Charleston Cougars men's basketball
College of Charleston Cougars men's basketball